Vlamertinge is a village in the Belgian province of West Flanders and a borough of the city of Ypres. The village center of Vlamertinge lies just outside the city center of Ypres, along the main road N38 to the nearby town of Poperinge.

In addition to the city center of Ypres itself, Vlamertinge is the largest borough of Ypres. In the west of Vlamertinge, along the road to Poperinge, is the hamlet of Brandhoek.

History
The earliest data about Vlamertinge date from the Middle Ages. In 857 a chapel was built in Vlamertinge. In 970 Ypres was destroyed and the chapel of Vlamertinge burned down. The oldest document, known to date, which includes the name Flambertenges, is a deed of the year 1066. Baldwin V, Count of Flanders, his wife Adela and their son Baldwin, in this deed gave goods to the church and the Chapter (religion) from Sint-Pieters by Lille. These goods were, among others, a tenth located in Elverdinge and also a tenth located in Vlamertinge - "In territorio Furnensi, in villa Elverzenges, decinam unam ; Flambertenges decinam similiter unam".

In the Ancien Régime Vlamertinge was a "Heerlijkheid" of Veurne-Ambacht with 22 backlendings and suffered a lot from the sieges of nearby Ypres.

During the First World War, the whole village was destroyed by bombing. In 1944, during the Second World War, Vlamertinge was liberated by a Polish armored division.

Etymology
Vlamertinge would come from Flambert (a name) + inga (son, descendant of (genitive)) + heim (domicile). The oldest known spellings of the current Vlamertinge are: Flembertenges (1066), Flamertingha (1123), Flambertinghes (1142), Flamertinge (1154), Flamertinga (1185), Flamertinghe (1200), Flambertengues (1202), Flamertinghes (1238), Flamertinges (1269), Vlamertinghe (1272), Vlamertinghes (1275), Flamertenghe (1275), Vlamertincghe (1280), etc.

Geography

Vlamertinge is 17 meters above sea level. The municipality also borders Ypres in the East, Voormezele in the Southeast, Kemmel and Dikkebus in the South, Reningelst in the Southwest, Poperinge in the West, Elverdinge in the North and Brielen in the Northeast.

Demographic developments

From 1487 to 1697 we see a large decline in the population of Vlamertinge. The most plausible explanation for this would have been the Eighty Years' War in the Seventeen Provinces.

Economy

There are 70 to 80 stores in Vlamertinge. In Vlamertinge there is a large company Valcke that makes concrete constructions and therefore also offers employment for many people in the village.

Politics

Baljuws, lords & awnings
 1???-13??: Nicolas Den Hane (baljuw) 
 1441-1445: Jan Van Gavere (baljuw)
 1445-1447: Joris Paeldinc (baljuw)
 1447-1449: Nikolaas Van Aeltre (baljuw)
 1450-1451: Joost Van Gavere (baljuw)
 1452-1453: Roeland Bride (baljuw)
 1453-1457: Jaspar de Flandre (baljuw)  
 1550-1556: Clement De Schildere 
 1556-1561: Aernoud Porreye 
 1561-1581: Jan Looms (baljuw) 
 1581-1584: Thomas Van Der Zeerde
 1586-1593: Mathieu Tasseel
 1595-1675: Adrianus Cobbaert
 16??-1646: Pierre Immeloot (lord)
 1646-1653: David Immeloot (lord)
 1653-1703: Balthazar Henricus Immeloot (lord)
 16??-16??: Jan de Cerf (lord) 
 16??-1683: François de Cerf (lord)
 1679-1???: Jean Charles Augustus-de Harchies (awning)
 16??-1732: Jean-Baptiste Coppieters (lord)
 1756-1782: Fernand Jean-Baptiste Coppieters (lord)

Mayors
Vlamertinge had its own municipal council and mayor until the mergers of 1977. Mayors were:
 1796-1799: Joannes Baptiste Dionysius Gontier
 1799-1806: Franciscus Dominicus Ludovicus Gryson
 1806-1820: Joannes Ignatius Onraet
 1820-1836: Lucien Boedt
 1836-1842: Joseph Verminck
 1843-1862: Dominique van Zuylen van Nyevelt
 1862-1895: Jules Veys
 1896-1909: Amand Vandaele
 1910-1927: Evarist Vande Lanoitte
 1927-1928: Marcel Vandenbulcke
 1928-1946: Florentin Bouton
 1941-1944: Rafaël Six
 1947-1952: Usmar Bonte
 1953-1970: Julien Bouton
 1970-1976: Georges Platteau

Sights
 The St. Vedast Church
 The former town hall of Vlamertinge from 1922, in neo-Flemish Renaissance style
 The Castle of Vlamertinge or Castle du Parc was built in 1857-1858 by order of the Viscount Pierre-Gustave du Parc, after a design by Joseph Schadde.
 In Vlamertinge there are a number of British military cemeteries from the First World War:
 Brandhoek Military Cemetery
 Red Farm Military Cemetery
 Vlamertinghe Military Cemetery
 Vlamertinghe New Military Cemetery
 Railway Chateau Cemetery
 Divisional Cemetery
 Brandhoek New Military Cemetery
 Brandhoek New Military Cemetery No.3
 Hop Store Cemetery

Associations 
Vlamertinge has many associations. The largest association is Chiro Vlamertinge. This youth movement has activities every two weeks at their premises.

Sport
Football club KSK Vlamertinge has been affiliated with the Belgian Football Association since the 1930s and is active in the provincial series.

Nickname
People speak of "Vlamertingse Pottebrekers"(Vlamertingisch pot crushers), and the pots that are meant here are obviously beer pots.

Well-known inhabitants
Joris Six

Honorary citizens
Jan Hoet (first person in the history of Vlamertinge who obtained honorary citizenship)

References

External links
 http://www.dekroniekenvandewesthoek.be/de-23-hoeken-van-vlamertinge/
 https://lib.ugent.be/fulltxt/RUG01/001/309/960/RUG01-001309960_2010_0001_AC.pdf
 https://issuu.com/stadieper/docs/elverdingevlamertinge_brochure/42

Populated places in West Flanders